Cacama is a genus of cactus dodgers in the family Cicadidae. There are about 12 described species in Cacama.

Species
These 12 species belong to the genus Cacama:
 Cacama californica Davis, 1919 i c g b
 Cacama carbonaria Davis, 1919 i c g b
 Cacama collinaplaga Sanborn & Heath in Sanborn, Heath, Phillips & Heath, 2011 i c g b
 Cacama crepitans (Van Duzee, 1914) i c g b
 Cacama dissimilis (Distant, 1881) i c g b
 Cacama furcata Davis, 1919 i c g b
 Cacama longirostris (Distant, 1881) i c g b
 Cacama maura (Distant, 1881) i c g b
 Cacama moorei Sanborn & Heath in Sanborn, Heath, Phillips & Heath, 2011 i c g b (Moore's cactus dodger)
 Cacama pygmaea Sanborn in Sanborn, Heath, Phillips & Heath, 2011 i c g b
 Cacama valvata (Uhler, 1888) i c g b (common cactus dodger)
 Cacama variegata Davis, 1919 i c g b (variegated cactus dodger)
Data sources: i = ITIS, c = Catalogue of Life, g = GBIF, b = Bugguide.net

References

Further reading

 
 
 
 
 
 
 
 

Articles created by Qbugbot
Cryptotympanini
Cicadidae genera